Frederick Ausfeld (1860 – c. 1930) was a US-based, German-born architect. He designed buildings in Montgomery, Alabama, some of which are listed on the National Register of Historic Places.

Early life
Frederick Ausfeld was born in 1860 in Kirchen, Germany.

Career
Ausfeld worked as an architect in Philadelphia by 1890. He designed buildings alongside fellow architect
Ausfeld moved to Alabama. With Chapman, he designed the Sumter County Courthouse in Livington in 1903. He also designed the Bell Building in Montgomery in 1907. By 1916, he designed the Covington County Courthouse in Andalusia, Alabama with Frank Lockwood. He designed the Jefferson Davis Hotel in Montgomery in 1928. He also designed the Shepherd Building in Montgomery in 1922. Additionally, he designed the Sidney Lanier High School in Montgomery. Several of his buildings are listed on the National Register of Historic Places.

Works include (with attribution):
Bell Building, 207 Montgomery St., Montgomery, AL (Ausfeld & Blount), NRHP-listed
Covington County Courthouse and Jail, 101 N. Court Sq., Andalusia, AL (Ausfeld, Fredrick), NRHP-listed
Jefferson Davis Hotel, Catoma and Montgomery Sts., Montgomery, AL (Ausfeld, Frederick), NRHP-listed
Shepherd Building (1922), 312 Montgomery St., Montgomery, AL (Ausfeld, Frederick), NRHP-listed 
Sumter County Courthouse, US 11, Livingston, AL (Ausfeld & Chapman), NRHP-listed
Sidney Lanier High School, Montgomery, Alabama

Death
Ausfeld died circa 1930.

References

1860 births
1930s deaths
People from Kirchen
People from Montgomery, Alabama
German emigrants to the United States
19th-century German architects
Architects from Alabama
20th-century German architects